Senator Meeks may refer to:

James Meeks (born 1956), Illinois State Senate
Robert Meeks (born 1934), Indiana State Senate

See also
Mariannette Miller-Meeks (born 1955), Iowa State Senate
Senator Meeks (disambiguation)